Remedios T. Romualdez, officially the Municipality of Remedios T. Romualdez,  is a 5th class municipality in the province of Agusan del Norte, Philippines. According to the 2020 census, it has a population of 17,155 people.

The town is one of the leading rice producers of Agusan del Norte province.

Etymology 
Remedios T. Romualdez was named after Remedios Trinidad Romualdez, the mother of former First Lady Imelda Marcos, the wife of former Philippine President Ferdinand Marcos.

History 
Remedios T. Romualdez was created into a municipality on September 8, 1982, when the barangays of Agay, Basilisa, Humilog, Tagbongabong, San Antonio, and Panaytayon, all of the then-municipality of Cabadbaran, were constituted into the newly created town, through Batas Pambansa Blg. 236.

The seat of the Municipal Government Center was designated in Barangay Agay, now Barangay Poblacion 1.

Remedios T. Romualdez is the youngest town in the Province of Agusan del Norte.

Geography
According to the Philippine Statistics Authority, the municipality has a land area of  constituting  of the  total area of Agusan del Norte.

It is situated along the Maharlika Highway. It is bounded by Cabadbaran to the north, Municipality of Sibagat, Agusan del Sur to the east, Butuan to the south, and Magallanes, Agusan del Norte to the west.

Elevation 
Elevation at these coordinates is estimated at 23.8 meters above sea level (M.a.s.l.).

Climate

Barangays
Remedios T. Romualdez is politically subdivided into 8 barangays.

Demographics

In the 2020 census, Remedios T. Romualdez had a population of 17,155.

Economy

Tourism

Nature and Man-made Attractions 

 Tagnote Falls - located at Sitio Tagnote, Barangay San Antonio
 Sak-a Falls - located in Barangay San Antonio
 Mount Hilong-Hilong - accessible through Malvar Trail situated in Barangay San Antonio, the highest mountain peak in the entire Caraga Region. It is 2,012 meters above sea level (masl)
 Humilog Cave 1 - located in Barangay Humilog

References

External links

 
 [ Philippine Standard Geographic Code]
 Official Municipality Map of RTR

Municipalities of Agusan del Norte